Olszyna is a town in Lower Silesian Voivodeship in south-west Poland.

Olszyna (meaning "alder wood") may also refer to the following places in Poland: 
Olszyna, Lubusz Voivodeship (west Poland)
Olszyna, Podlaskie Voivodeship (north-east Poland)
Olszyna, Silesian Voivodeship (south Poland)
Olszyna, Greater Poland Voivodeship (west-central Poland)
Olszyna, Świętokrzyskie Voivodeship (south-central Poland)
Olszyna, Oborniki County in Greater Poland Voivodeship (west-central Poland)
Olszyna, West Pomeranian Voivodeship (north-west Poland)

See also
 
 Stara Olszyna
 Truskolasy-Olszyna